is the 5th single by the Hello! Project girl group Tanpopo. It was released on July 5, 2000 under the Zetima label with the catalog number EPCE-5060. "Otome Pasta ni Kandō" is also featured on the album All of Tanpopo as the opening track. In the single's first week it sold 154,960 copies, selling 349,900 copies overall.
The single peaked at #3 on the Oricon weekly charts, charting for eleven weeks. The single is the first release from the group's "second generation" (Kaori Iida, Mari Yaguchi, Rika Ishikawa, and Ai Kago).

In 2002, an English-language cover (titled "The Weekends") was recorded by Mylin Brooks, formerly of the "Mickey Mouse Club", for the album Cover Morning Musume Hello! Project!.

Track listing

References

External links
  entry on the Hello! Project official website
 Otome Pasta ni Kandō Up-Front Works
Comments on Tsuku's official website

Tanpopo songs
2000 singles
Japanese-language songs
Songs written by Tsunku
Song recordings produced by Tsunku
2000 songs
Zetima Records singles